Gymnoscelis exangulata is a moth in the family Geometridae. It is found on Seram, New Guinea and the Solomon Islands.

References

Moths described in 1907
Gymnoscelis